Zhu Quan (27 May 1378 – 12 October 1448), the Prince of Ning, was a Chinese historian, military commander, musician, and playwright. He was the 17th son of the Hongwu Emperor of the Ming dynasty. During his life, he served as a military commander, feudal lord, historian, and playwright. He is also remembered as a great tea connoisseur, a zither player, and composer.

Other names
In addition to Prince of Ning, Zhu Quan was also known as the Strange Scholar of the Great Ming (Da Ming Qi Shi). As part of his Taoist attempts to avoid death, he adopted the aliases the Emaciated Immortal (Qúxiān), the "Master who Encompasses Emptiness" (Hánxūzi), "Taoist of the Mysterious Continent" or " Taoist of the Mysterious Island" (Xuánzhōu Dàoren), and "Perfected Gentleman of the Marvelous Way of the Unfathomable Emptiness of the Southern Pole" (Nánjí Chōngxū Miàodào Zhēnjūn).

Biography

Zhu Quan was initially a military commander in service to his father, the Hongwu Emperor who founded the Ming dynasty. He was granted the frontier fief of Ning with his capital at Daning in present-day Chifeng, Inner Mongolia in 1391. He was famous for his mastery of art and war and played an important role during the unrest surrounding the ascension of his teenage nephew, Jianwen Emperor, in 1399.

Under the advice of his Confucian advisors, the Jianwen Emperor summoned his uncle to an audience in the imperial capital Nanjing. Wary of the emperor's intentions, as other uncles were demoted or executed the same year, Zhu Quan refused and lost three of his divisions for insubordination.

Zhu Di, the Prince of Yan, was preparing for his own uprising against the emperor and considered it a major point to neutralize Zhu Quan, a talented leader of well-trained troops located behind his lines. Taking advantage of Wu Gao's attack on Yongping near modern Shanhaiguan, the Prince of Yan  after crushing Wu Gao's force  rode hastily to Daning and feigned defeat and distress. After several days, his forces were in position and successfully captured Zhu Quan as he was seeing his brother off. The official history of the Ming records Daning's evacuation, with Zhu Quan's harem and courtiers removed to Songtingguan and the prince himself kept in the Yan capital at Beiping, but passes over Zhu Di's setting of the entire city to the torch and the destruction of Zhu Quan's extensive library.

From that point, Zhu Quan assisted his brother in his uprising, with the History of Ming recording that the Prince of Yan offered to split the entire empire between them. After his elevation as the Yongle Emperor in 1402, however, he swiftly reneged and refused to appoint his brother to lordship over Suzhou or Qiantang, instead giving him a choice only of backwater appointments. He settled upon Nanchang, the capital of Jiangxi. After a scare where he was accused of practicing wugu sorcery, Zhu Quan essentially retired from any interference with the realm, devoting his time instead to cultural pursuits.

Meeting daily with local or visiting scholars, he pursued immortality. He treasured and revised his Secret Book of Origins (Yuánshǐ Mìshū), a text which survived the fire of Daning and sharply attacked Buddhism as a foreign "mourning cult" at odds with Chinese culture and proper governance. His encyclopedia of Taoism, the Most Pure and Precious Books on the Way of August Heaven (Tiānhuáng Zhìdào Tàiqīngyù Cè), was so esteemed it joined the  Taoist canon. His brother ordered him to complete the Comprehensive Mirror of Extensive Essays (Tongjian Bolun) and was also credited with writing Family Advice (Jia Xun), Ceremonial Customs of the Country of Ning (Ningguo Yifan), The Secret History of the Han and Tang (Hàn-Táng Mìshǐ), History Breaks Off (Shi Duan), a Book of Essays (Wén Pǔ), a Book of Poetry (Shī Pǔ), and several other annotated anthologies. His most successful was his Tea Manual (Chá Pǔ). In addition, he personally funded the publication of many rare books and composed several operas.

Zhu Quan is an important figure in the history of the Chinese zither, or guqin, for his compilation of the important Manual of the Mysterious and Marvellous (Shénqí Mì Pǔ) in 1425. This is the earliest known large scale collection of qin scores to have survived to the present day.

Family
Consort:
Lady Zhang, Commander of the Wardens Zhang Tai's daughter, died before his own death.

Sons:
 1st son: Zhu Panshi (16 October 1395 – 23 February 1437), Hereditary Prince of Ning (created May 1404), posthumously initially honored Hereditary Prince Zhuanghui (honored 1437), later honored Prince Hui of Ning (honored 1449).
 Married Commander of the East City Wardens Yu Sheng's daughter as Hereditary Princess of Ning in March 1417
 2nd son: Died young
 3rd son: Zhu Panye, originally the Prince Kangxi of Linchuan, later demoted to commoner rank (demoted 1461).
 Married Deputy Commander of the North City Wardens Huang Fu's daughter (d. January 1440) in August 1426, later married Company Commander Wang Xing's daughter in May 1455.
 4th son: Zhu Panyao (October 1414 – July 1492), Prince Anjian of Yichun (created August 1428). His mother was Lady Wang.
 Married Jinwu Rear Guard Commander Liu Xun's daughter in October 1430
 5th son: Zhu Panzhu (October 1419 – 1459), Prince Anxi of Xinchang (created October 1430). His title later cancelled due to his not having a son, but he had a daughter, Princess Nankang.
 Married Xiaoling Guard Commander Ge Tan's daughter in March 1437
 6th son: Zhu Panmou (1420 – January 1439), Prince Daohui of Xinfeng (created October 1432). His title later cancelled due to his not having a son. His mother was Lady You.

Daughters:
 1st daughter: Princess Yongxin (created July 1427)
 Married Jinxiang Guard Drafter Gao Heling
 2nd daughter: Princess Yushan (created July 1427)
 Married Chief Commissioner Drafter Fang Jingxiang
 3nd daughter: Princess Qingjiang (created February 1427)
 Married Xi'ning Guard Commander Chen Tong's younger brother Chen Yi
 4th daughter: Princess Fengxin (created 2 March 1427)
 Married Wang Shuang
 5th daughter: Princess Jinxi (d. August 1449) (created February 1427)
 Married the Right Army Commissioner Han Guan's younger brother Han Fu
 6th daughter: Princess Taihe (created February 1427)
 Married Wang Yencheng of Poyang County's son Wang Zhanran
 7th daughter: Princess Pengze (created February 1427)
 Married Longxiang Guard Commander Wang Gang's nephew Wang Zhi
 8th daughter: Princess Luling (created February 1427)
 Married Qizhou Guard Commander Tian Sheng's younger brother Tian Yu
 9th daughter: Princess Xinyu (created February 1427)
 Married Ganzhou Prefecture Record Keeper Hu Yu's son Hu Guangji
 10th daughter: Princess Xincheng (created February 1427)
 Married Regent (Liushou) Central Guard Commander Li Jun's son Li Huan
 11th daughter: Princess Fuliang (created July 1427)
 12th daughter: Died young, no title
 13th daughter:  Princess Nanfeng (created February 1427)
 Married Jiangxi Military Commissioner Zhang Xiang's son Zhang Wen
 14th daughter: Princess Yongfeng (created June 1438)

Descendants
1st Prince: Zhu Quan, Prince Xian of Ning
Hereditary Prince: Zhu Panshi, Prince Hui of Ning
2nd Prince: Zhu Dianpei, Prince Jing of Ning
3rd Prince: Zhu Kunjun, Prince Kang of Ning
4th Prince: Zhu Chenhao, Prince of Ning

Zhu Quan is also the ancestor of the famous Chinese painter Zhu Da.

See also
Tea Classics
Guqin

References

1378 births
1448 deaths
15th-century Chinese dramatists and playwrights
15th-century Chinese historians
Chinese food writers
Chinese military leaders
Chinese tea masters
Guqin players
Historians from Jiangsu
Lords
Ming dynasty historians
Ming dynasty imperial princes
Ming dynasty musicians
Ming dynasty Taoists
Musicians from Nanjing
Writers from Nanjing
15th-century Chinese musicians
Sons of emperors